EXT3 is a human gene.

It is associated with hereditary multiple exostoses.

References